Edward Beecher D.D. (August 27, 1803 – July 28, 1895) was an American theologian, the son of Lyman Beecher and the brother of Harriet Beecher Stowe and Henry Ward Beecher.

Biography
Beecher was born August 27, 1803, in East Hampton, New York.  He graduated from Yale College in 1822.  After this, he studied theology at Andover Theological School.

In 1826, he became the pastor of Park Street Church in Boston, Massachusetts. He married Isabella (Porter) Jones in 1829 and together they had eleven children. In 1830, he became the first president of Illinois College at Jacksonville, Illinois, where he remained president for 14 years. He was a close friend of Elijah P. Lovejoy and helped organize the first anti-slavery society in Illinois. His wife, Isabella, wrote to his sister, Harriet Beecher Stowe, to inspire her to write "Uncle Tom's Cabin".

He returned to Boston in 1844. He was the pastor of Salem Street Church until 1855, when he returned to Illinois and became the pastor of the First Congregational Church of Galesburg. In 1871 he settled in Brooklyn, New York, where from 1885 to 1889 he was pastor of the Parkville church. He died there on July 28, 1895.

He was senior editor of The Congregationalist (1849—1855), and an associate editor of the Christian Union from 1870.

Published works
Addresses on the Kingdom of God (1827)
Six Sermons on the Nature, Importance, and Means of Eminent Holiness throughout the Church (New York, 1835)
History of the Alton Riots (1837)
Statement of Anti-Slavery Principles (1837)
 Narrative of Riots at Alton: in Connection with the Death of Rev. Elijah P. Lovejoy (1838)Baptism, With Reference to its Import and Modes (1849)The Conflict of Ages: or, The Great Debate on the Moral Relations of God and Man (1853) The Papal Conspiracy Exposed, and Protestantism Defended: in the Light of Reason, History & Scripture (1855)
 Death Not Life, or, The Destruction of the Wicked (Commonly Called Annihilation) Established and Endless Misery Disproved by a Collection and Explanation of all Passages on Future Punishment (1859)The Concord of Ages (1860)Secret Societies: A Discussion of their Character and Claims (1867)History of Opinions on the Scriptural Doctrine of Future Retribution'' (1878)

See also 
Beecher family

Notes

External links
Edward Beecher
Beecher Genealogy
Beecher family - Edward Beecher
Beecher family papers, 1822-1903
Beecher Family
 
 

1803 births
1895 deaths
19th-century Congregationalist ministers
Phillips Academy alumni
Yale College alumni
People from Brooklyn
People from Galesburg, Illinois
People from Jacksonville, Illinois
People from Boston
People from East Hampton (town), New York
Beecher family
American abolitionists
American Congregationalist ministers
American people of Welsh descent
Editors of Christian publications
American conspiracy theorists
Critics of the Catholic Church
Illinois College faculty
Activists from New York (state)
Congregationalist abolitionists
19th-century American clergy